Storm is a Python programming library for object-relational mapping between one or more SQL databases and Python objects.  It allows Python developers to formulate complex queries spanning multiple database tables to support dynamic storage and retrieval of object information.

MySQL, PostgreSQL and SQLite database support is built into Storm, and the API allows for support for others. Storm also supports the Django and Zope web frameworks natively. Twisted support is planned for the .20 release.

Development
Storm was developed at Canonical Ltd. in Python for use in the Launchpad and Landscape applications and subsequently released in 2007 as free software. The project is free software and released under the GNU Lesser General Public License and contributors are required to assign copyrights to Canonical. Version control is done in bazaar and issue tracking in Launchpad.

See also

DatabaseObjects
TurboGears
SQLAlchemy
SQLObject

References

External links

Canonical (company)
Computer libraries
Free computer libraries
Object-relational mapping
Python (programming language) libraries